The 2012 World Outdoor Bowls Championship women's pairs  was held at the Lockleys Bowling Club in Adelaide, Australia. Some of the qualifying Rounds were held at the nearby Holdfast Bowling Club in Glenelg North.

Rebecca Quail & Kelsey Cottrell won the women's pairs Gold.

Section tables

Pool 1

Pool 2

Finals

Results

References

2012 in Australian women's sport
Wom
Wor